In mathematics, a Fredholm kernel is a certain type of a kernel on a Banach space, associated with nuclear operators on the Banach space.  They are an abstraction of the idea of the Fredholm integral equation and the Fredholm operator, and are one of the objects of study in Fredholm theory. Fredholm kernels are named in honour of Erik Ivar Fredholm. Much of the abstract theory of Fredholm kernels was developed by Alexander Grothendieck and published in 1955.

Definition
Let B be an arbitrary Banach space, and let B* be its dual, that is, the space of bounded linear functionals on B. The tensor product  has a completion under the norm

where the infimum is taken over all finite representations

The completion, under this norm, is often denoted as

and is called the projective topological tensor product.  The elements of this space are called Fredholm kernels.

Properties
Every Fredholm kernel has a representation in the form

Associated with each such kernel is a linear operator

which has the canonical representation

Associated with every Fredholm kernel is a trace, defined as

p-summable kernels
A Fredholm kernel is said to be  p-summable if

A Fredholm kernel is said to be of order q if q is the infimum of all  for all p for which it is p-summable.

Nuclear operators on Banach spaces
An operator  :  is said to be a nuclear operator if there exists an 
 ∈  such that  =  .  Such an operator is said to be -summable and of order  if  is.  In general, there may be more than one  associated with such a nuclear operator, and so the trace is not uniquely defined. However, if the order  ≤ 2/3, then there is a unique trace, as given by a theorem of Grothendieck.

Grothendieck's theorem
If  is an operator of order  then a trace may be defined, with

Furthermore, the Fredholm determinant

is an entire function of z. The formula

holds as well. Finally, if  is parameterized by some complex-valued parameter w, that is, and the parameterization is holomorphic on some domain, then

is holomorphic on the same domain.

Examples
An important example is the Banach space of holomorphic functions over a domain . In this space, every nuclear operator is of order zero, and is thus of trace-class.

Nuclear spaces
The idea of a nuclear operator can be adapted to Fréchet spaces. A nuclear space is a Fréchet space where every bounded map of the space to an arbitrary Banach space is nuclear.

References

 

Fredholm theory
Banach spaces
Topology of function spaces
Topological tensor products
Linear operators